Carichí is a town in the Mexican state of Chihuahua. It serves as the municipal seat of the surrounding municipality of the same name.

The town was founded as a Jesuit mission (Misión de Jesús de Carachí) on 18 November 1675. Its name comes from the Tarahumara name Güerocarichí. Prior to 24 August 1982, the town was officially known by the alternative name Carichic.

As of 2020, the town of Carichí had a population of 1,830., up from 1,672 as of 2010.

Geography and climate 
Carichí is located at an altitude of 2,064 m (6,772 ft). Carchi has a semi-arid climate.

References

Populated places established in 1675
Populated places in Chihuahua (state)
1675 establishments in the Spanish Empire